Ben Rehder is an Austin-based author of mysteries, most notably his work titled "Blanco Country". His debut novel was widely praised with starred reviews in Publishers Weekly and the Library Journal. It was also an Edgar Award finalist.

Education 
He graduated from the University of Texas in 1986, and then entered the field of advertising.

Blanco County series 

The Blanco County series centers on the exploits of John Marlin, a game warden who is often reluctantly drawn into homicide investigations.  In addition to serving as mysteries, the series is also a humorous look at the hunting culture of Texas, in a satiric, madcap style akin to Carl Hiaasen and Tim Dorsey. 
  (2002)  Buck Fever
  (2003)  Bone Dry
  (2004)  Flat Crazy
  (2005)  Guilt Trip
  (2007)  Gun Shy
  (2008)  Holy Moly
  (2014)  Mind Game
  (2014)  Hog Heaven
  (2014)  Stag Party
  (2015)  Bum Steer
  (2016)  Point Taken
  (2017)  Dog Tag
  (2017)  Last Laugh
  (2018)  Lefty Loosey
  (2020)  Free Ride

Roy Ballard Books
  (2012)  Gone the Next
  (2014)  Get Busy Dying
  (2015)  If I had a Nickel
  (2016)  Now You See Him
  (2018)  A Tooth For a Tooth
  (2019)  Shake and Bake
  (2020)  Better To Be Lucky

Standalone novels
  (2012)  The Chicken Hanger
  (2012)  The Driving Lesson

References

External links 
 Author site

21st-century American novelists
American male novelists
American mystery writers
Writers from Austin, Texas
Living people
21st-century American male writers
Novelists from Texas
Year of birth missing (living people)